Castres (Castras in the Languedocian dialect of Occitan) is the sole subprefecture of the Tarn department in the Occitanie region in Southern France. It lies in the former province of Languedoc, although not in the former region of Languedoc-Roussillon. In 2018, the commune had a population of 41,795.

Castres is the fourth-largest industrial centre of the predominantly rural former Midi-Pyrénées region after Toulouse, Tarbes and Albi, as well as the largest in the part of Languedoc lying between Toulouse and Montpellier. It is noted for being the birthplace of the famous socialist leader Jean Jaurès (1859–1914) and home to the important Goya Museum of Spanish painting.

Demographics
In 1831, the population of Castres was 12,032, making it the largest town of the department of Tarn. One of the few industrial towns in the region of Albigeois, the population of the commune proper grew to 19,483 in 1901, and 34,126 by 1954. However, with the decline of its industries, population growth diminished. Albi surpassed Castres as the most populous metropolitan area of Tarn. The population of Castres reached its peak in 1975, after that it has been decreasing slowly. Castres is the centre of a functional urban area with 104,695 inhabitants (2019).

Geography
Castres is intersected from north to south by the rivers Agout and Durenque.

The Thoré forms most of the commune's south-eastern border, then flows into the Agout, which forms part of its western border.

Administration
Between 1790 and 1797 Castres was the prefecture of Tarn.

Since 2001, the mayor of Castres has been Pascal Bugis (right, member of UMP), who defeated the then socialist mayor in the 2001 election after a campaign focused on the bad records of the socialist mayor on fighting crime, and the high level of insecurity in the town.

Castres has teamed up with the nearby town of Mazamet ( southeast of Castres) and the independent suburbs and villages in between to create the communauté d'agglomération de Castres Mazamet, which was established in December 1999. The communauté d'agglomération groups 14 independent communes (including Castres and Mazamet), with a total population of 78,101 inhabitants (2018), 54% of these living in the commune of Castres proper, 13% in the commune of Mazamet, and the rest in the communes in between.

The communauté d'agglomération was created in order to better coordinate transport, infrastructure, housing, and economic policies between the communes of the area. The current president of the communauté d'agglomération is Pascal Bugis, mayor of Castres.

History

The name of the town comes from Latin castrum, and means "fortified place". Castres grew up round the Benedictine abbey of Saint Benoît, which is believed to have been founded in AD 647, possibly on the site of an old Roman fort (castrum). Castres became an important stop on the international pilgrimage routes to Santiago de Compostela in Spain because its abbey-church, built in the 9th century, was keeping the relics of Saint Vincent, the renowned martyr of Spain. It was a place of some importance as early as the 12th century, and ranked as the second town of the Albigeois behind Albi. Despite the decline of its abbey, which in 1074 came under the authority of Saint Victor abbey in Marseille, Castres was granted a liberal charter in the 12th century by the famous Trencavel family, viscounts of Albi. Resulting from the charter, Castres was ruled by a college of consuls.

During the Albigensian Crusade it surrendered of its own accord to Simon de Montfort, and thus entered into the kingdom of France in 1229. In 1317, Pope John XXII established the bishopric of Castres. In 1356, the town of Castres was raised to a countship by King John II of France. However, the town greatly suffered from the Black Plague in 1347-1348, then from the Black Prince of England and the Free Companies (bands of lawless mercenaries) who laid waste the country during the Hundred Years' War. Consequently, by the late 14th century Castres entered a period of sharp decline. In 1375, there were only 4,000 inhabitants left in town, only half the figure  from a century before. Following the confiscation of the possessions of Jacques d'Armagnac, duke  of  Nemours, to which the countship of Castres had passed, it was bestowed in 1476 by King Louis XI on Boffille de Juge (Boffillo del Giudice), an Italian nobleman and adventurer serving as a diplomat for Louis XI, but the appointment led to so much disagreement (family feud between Boffille de Juge, his only daughter, and his brother-in-law)  that the countship was united to the crown by King Francis I in 1519.

Around 1560, the majority of the population of Castres converted to Protestantism. In the wars of the latter part of the 16th century the inhabitants sided with the Protestant party, fortified the town, and established an independent republic. Castres was one of the largest Protestant strongholds in southern France, along with Montauban and La Rochelle. Henry of Navarre, leader of the Protestant party, who later became King Henry IV of France, stayed in Castres in 1585. The Protestants of Castres were brought to terms, however, by King Louis XIII in 1629, and Richelieu came himself to Castres to have its fortifications dismantled. Nonetheless, after these religious wars, the town, now in peace, enjoyed a period of rapid expansion. Business and traditional commercial activities revived, in particular fur and leather-dressing, tanning, and above all wool trade. Culture flourished anew, with the founding of the Academy of Castres in 1648. Castres was turned by the Catholic Church into an active center of Counter-Reformation, with the establishments of several convents in town, and the building of a renowned bishop's palace by Mgr. Tubœuf, still the most famous monument in town today. A new cathedral was also built, after the destructions of the religious wars. Perhaps even more important, Castres was made the seat of the Chambre de l'Édit of the Parliament of Toulouse, a court of justice detached from the Parliament of Toulouse and in charge of dealing with the cases involving the Protestants of Languedoc, a measure of protection granted to them by the Edict of Nantes. This court attracted much business to Castres. In 1665, there were 7,000 inhabitants in Castres, 4,000 of whom Catholic, and 3,000 Protestant.

In 1670 however, the Chambre de l'Édit was transferred to Castelnaudary, much to the discontent of even the catholic citizens of Castres, who lost a major source of business and revenue with the departure of the lawyers and the plaintiffs. The Revocation of the Edict of Nantes soon followed, and Castres suffered greatly when many Protestants chose to go into exile. Then came the plague of 1720-1721 and the fire of 1724. Last but not least, Castres lost its liberal charter in 1758. In the 1760s, a few years after the famous Calas Affair in Toulouse, Castres made the headlines nationwide: Pierre-Paul Sirven and his wife, both Protestants, were wrongly accused of having murdered their daughter in order to prevent her from converting to Catholicism. Tried and sentenced to death in absentia on March 29, 1764, they were defended by Voltaire, and eventually exonerated in 1771.

The outbreak of the French Revolution was generally welcomed in Castres, particularly among the local Protestant merchants and entrepreneurs, but the majority of the population remained moderate during the whole period. In 1793 for instance, Protestant pastor Alba La Source, Castres' representative at the Convention in Paris, opposed the deportation of "non-juror" Catholic priests to French Guiana, where death in the horrid jungle was certain (see Civil Constitution of the Clergy). "Non-juror" priests were by far the majority in the region of Castres. Accused of being a moderate, Alba La Source was guillotined in October 1793. Suspected of being lukewarm toward the revolution, Castres was duly chastised. The bishopric which had been established by Pope John XXII in 1317 was abolished, Castres later becoming part of the bishopric of Albi.

Despite these setbacks, in the 19th century the economy of Castres developed greatly, and the town grew outside of its old medieval center. As early as 1815, the first mechanized wool mill was set up in town. Originally specialized in luxury cloth, the Castres textile industry then turned toward more ordinary types of cloth, whose markets were considerably larger. Around 1860, there were 50 wool mills in town, employing 3,000 people. In the end of the 19th century, mechanical engineering industries appeared beside the textile industry, which led to Castres becoming a major arsenal for the French army during the First World War. Castres was linked to the French railway network in 1865.

However, in the 20th century the town entered a new period of decline. Although Castres emerged from the two world wars unscathed, no military operations or combats taking place in southwest France, the local economy has been hard hit by change. Like so many towns and cities of Europe which had benefited most from the Industrial Revolution, Castres is experiencing a difficult restructuring of its industrial base. Textile has particularly suffered. Castres is also crippled by its geographical location, isolated in a dead end at the foot of the Massif Central mountains, away from the main exchange and transport routes. Castres is still not connected to the motorway (freeway) network of France, the only town of that size in France not yet connected. The creation of the Greater Castres-Mazamet Council in 2000 was expected to deal with the transport problem, and to work on attracting new industries. The long-promised motorway link with Toulouse is due to be completed soon, and Castres hopes to benefit from its proximity with the big Occitan city.

Economy
The principal industries are mechanical and electrical engineering, machine tools, wooden furniture, granite, textile, fur and leather-dressing, tanning, chemicals, pharmaceuticals, and selective breeding of cows.

Traditional and polluting industries such as textile, tanning, fur and leather-dressing, or chemicals, are in sharp decline. However, a multinational pharmaceutical group (Pierre Fabre Group) emerged in the town in the 1960s, and it has kept its headquarters and R&D division in the metropolitan area, helping to counterbalance the general decline in industry. Some now accuse its founder and president, Pierre Fabre, of being the real "master" of Castres, making and designating Castres' mayors at will.

Transport

The Gare de Castres railway station is served by regional trains to Mazamet and Toulouse.

People
Castres is the hometown of  socialist politician and newspaper publisher Jean Jaurès (1859–1914), who was murdered in Paris the day before the start of the First World War.

Mathematician Pierre de Fermat died in Castres in 1665, while attending a session of the Chambre de l'Édit there.

French writer Roger Peyrefitte was born into a wealthy family of Castres in 1907.

Former French footballer Claude Puel was also born in Castres.

Other people born in the city include:
Guilhabert de Castres - Cathar bishop
Nicolas Jean de Dieu Soult - Politician and marshal during the Napoleonic wars
André Dacier - Scholar
John Ligonier, 1st Earl Ligonier - British general
Paul de Rapin - Historian
Roger Peyrefitte - Diplomat and author
Claude Puel - Football player and manager
Charles Blanc - Art critic
Yannick Jauzion - Rugby union player
Clément Poitrenaud - Rugby union player
Pierre Camara - Athlete
Pierre-Paul Sirven - philosopher
Maryline Salvetat -cyclist.
Guillaume Borne - footballer
Maurice Gabolde - Minister of Justice in the Vichy regime of Philippe Petain
Lore Baudrit - ice hockey player

Residents of Castres include:
Paul Pellisson - Author
Anne Lefèvre - Scholar
Jean Bon Saint-André - Politician during the Revolution era
Bernardo Gui - Inquisitor
Philip of Montfort, Lord of Castres - Nobleman
Boffille de Juge - Statesman
Vincent Baron - Theologian
Pierre de Fermat - Mathematician
Kees Meeuws - Rugby union player
Christophe Farnaud - French ambassador to Greece
Hans Bellmer - Artist

Main sights
Castres is intersected from north to south by the river Agout. The river is fringed by old houses the upper stories of which project over its waters.

The church of Saint Benoît, once the cathedral of Castres, and the most important of the churches of Castres today, dates only from the 17th and 18th centuries. The city hall occupies the former bishop's palace, designed in the 17th century by  Jules Hardouin-Mansart (the architect of Versailles), and with gardens designed by André Le Nôtre (the  designer of the gardens in Versailles). The Romanesque tower beside it (Tour Saint Benoît) is the only survival of the old Benedictine abbey. The town possesses some old mansions from the 16th and 17th century, including the Hôtel de Nayrac, of the Renaissance.

Castres possesses the renowned Goya Museum, created in 1840, which contains the largest collection of Spanish paintings in France. A Jaurès Museum was also opened in 1954 in the house where Jean Jaurès was born in 1859.

The Jardin botanique Pierre Fabre "La Michonne" is a private botanical garden and conservatory that can be visited.

Sports
As one might expect of a town of western Occitania nicknamed Ovalie, the main sport in Castres is rugby union, followed religiously by many locals. The local professional club is Castres Olympique, who are five-time champions of France (in 1949, 1950, 1993, 2013 and 2018). Castres Olympique is the property of local tycoon Pierre Fabre, founder and president of Pierre Fabre Group.

The finish of Stage 12 of the 2007 Tour de France was in Castres.

Education 
 Jean-François Champollion University Center for Teaching and Research

Cinema

Castres is the place where a short film festival occurs each year.

Medias

The city happened to see the birth of its first student radio (RADIOM) in 2007.

Twin towns

Castres is twinned with:
 Linares, Spain
 Wakefield, England
 Butare, Rwanda

See also
 Castres-Mazamet Airport
 Communes of the Tarn department
 Tourism in Tarn

References

External links

City Hall of Castres official website 
Greater Castres-Mazamet Council official website 
Photographe maternité mariage Castres 
Chamber of Commerce of Castres-Mazamet 
Castres Olympique Rugby Club website 
See pictures from Antonio Mucherino's web site 

Communes of Tarn (department)
Subprefectures in France
Languedoc